Geraldo Brindeiro (29 August 1948 – 29 October 2021) was a Brazilian jurist, lawyer, and academic. Brindeiro joined the national Public Prosecutor's Office in 1975. On June 28, 1995, President Fernando Henrique Cardoso appointed him as Prosecutor General of the Republic, the head of the Brazilian Federal Prosecution Office. He was reappointed for three additional terms until his retirement from the office on June 28, 2003, at the end of fourth term.

Biography
His paternal uncle, was a justice of the Supreme Federal Court from 1967 to 1989, while his cousin, Marco Maciel, served as Vice President of Brazil from 1995 to 2002.

He received a bachelor's degree in legal and social sciences from the Faculty of Law of Recife (now known as the Law School of the Federal University of Pernambuco) on December 17, 1970. He later completed his Master of Laws (1982) and Doctor of Juridical Science (1990) from Yale Law School in Connecticut. 

Geraldo Brindeiro died from complications of COVID-19 in Brasilia on October 29, 2021, at the age of 73.

References

1948 births
2021 deaths
Prosecutors General of the Republic (Brazil)
20th-century Brazilian lawyers
21st-century Brazilian lawyers
Yale Law School alumni
Federal University of Pernambuco alumni
People from Recife
Deaths from the COVID-19 pandemic in Federal District (Brazil)